Porterfield may refer to:

People
Porterfield (surname)

Places
 Porterfield, Wisconsin, a town, United States
 Porterfield (community), Wisconsin, an unincorporated community, United States
 Porterfield Lakes, Nova Scotia, Canada
 HM Prison Inverness, also known as Porterfield Prison

Other uses
 Porterfield Aircraft Corporation, an American aircraft design and manufacturing company founded in 1934
 , an American naval destroyer in service 194369

See also